Joro or variation, may refer to:

People
 , a moniker for a historical class of geisha known for sleeping with customers
 , a class of sex worker in historic Japanese red-light districts
 , a title used in the Shogunate, in the Ōoku
 Lady Kasuga (1579–1643), the first Jōrō Otoshiyori
 Joro the Paver, a 1960s serial rapist from Sofia, Bulgaria

Fictional characters
 Joro, a fictional character from Japanese light novel Oresuki, see List of Oresuki characters
 Joro, a fictional character from Willard Price's Adventure series, see List of villains in Willard Price's Adventure series
 Joro, a fictional character from Italian fantasy film Creators: The Past
 Joro, a fictional character from Italian comedy film God Willing (2006 film)
 Joro D, a fictional character from the Nigerian comedy film Chief Daddy
 Prince Joro, a fictional character created by Roman Frederick Starzl

Places
 Joro, Asa, Afon, Kwara, Nigeria; a village, see List of villages in Kwara State
 Joro, Ussa, Lissam II, Taraba, Nigeria; a village, see List of villages in Taraba State
 Jōro Station, a rail station in Gero, Gifu, Japan

Other uses
 Joro spider (女郎蜘蛛, 上臈蜘蛛, Jorō-gumo)
 Joro toxin (JSTX), the toxin of the Joro spider
 JORO (formerly KSBK), a former radio station in Naha, Okinawa, Japan
 joro, a ritual offering for dispelling fady (taboo)
 joro, an initiation ceremony performed by the Lobi people
 "Joro" (song), 2019 Afrobeats song by Wizkid, see Wizkid discography

See also

 Jorōgumo, Japanese mythological creature
 Yuki Jorō, Japanese mythological creature